Macbeth, Op. 23, is a symphonic poem written by Richard Strauss between 1886 and 1888. The work was his first tone poem, which Strauss described as "a completely new path" for him compositionally. Written in some semblance of sonata form, the piece was revised more thoroughly than any of Strauss's other works; these revisions, focused primarily on the development and recapitulation sections, show how much the composer was struggling at this point in his career to balance narrative content with musical form. Bryan Gilliam writes in The New Grove Dictionary of Music and Musicians that, "New path or not, Macbeth failed to find a firm place in the concert repertory, because it lacked the thematic cogency and convincing pacing of musical events so evident in the two antecedent works [Don Juan and Tod und Verklärung (Death and Transfiguration)]. And despite revisions to the orchestration, in an attempt to restrain inner voices and highlight principal themes, Macbeth still falls short of Don Juan and Tod und Verklärung in sonic clarity."

Instrumentation 
The piece is scored for 3 flutes (3rd doubling piccolo), 2 oboes, English horn, 2 clarinets, bass clarinet, 2 bassoons, contrabassoon, 4 horns, 3 trumpets, bass trumpet, 3 trombones, tuba, timpani, bass drum, snare drum, cymbals, tam-tam and strings.

References 
 ed. Stanley Sadie, The New Grove Dictionary of Music and Musicians, second edition, (London: Macmillan, 2001) 
Bryan Gilliam, "Strauss, Richard (Georg)"
MacDonald, Hugh, "Symphonic poem"

Notes

External links 
 

Tone poems by Richard Strauss
1888 compositions
Works based on Macbeth
Music based on works by William Shakespeare